Charles Newdigate Newdegate (14 July 1816 – 9 April 1887) was a British Conservative politician.
In Hansard the spelling is Newdegate.

Early life 
He was the only son of Charles Parker Newdigate Newdegate of Harefield Park, Uxbridge, Middlesex, and his wife, Maria Boucherett, of Lincolnshire. He was educated at Eton College, King's College London, and Christ Church, Oxford. He became a large landowner at a young age: in 1833 he inherited the Harefield Estate on his father's death, and two years later his uncle died leaving him Arbury Hall near Nuneaton, Warwickshire.

Member of parliament 
In 1843 Newdegate was elected to the United Kingdom House of Commons as Member of Parliament for North Warwickshire. He held the seat until its abolition under the Redistribution of Seats Act 1885. In parliament he formed part of the "Ultra" wing of the Tories, opposing the recreation of the Roman Catholic hierarchy, free trade and the disestablishment of the Church of Ireland.

Newdegate was also elected as a member of the Chilvers Coton (Warwickshire) Local Board of Health in 1850, whereupon he was appointed Chairman of that Board.

He died at Arbury Hall in April 1887, and was buried in Harefield Church, a building which he had personally spent much money restoring.

References

External links 
 
 

1816 births
1887 deaths
People educated at Eton College
Alumni of King's College London
Alumni of Christ Church, Oxford
English Anglicans
People from Warwickshire
Conservative Party (UK) MPs for English constituencies
UK MPs 1841–1847
UK MPs 1847–1852
UK MPs 1852–1857
UK MPs 1857–1859
UK MPs 1859–1865
UK MPs 1865–1868
UK MPs 1868–1874
UK MPs 1874–1880
UK MPs 1880–1885
Members of the Privy Council of the United Kingdom